State Route 153 (SR-153) is a state highway in the U.S. state of Utah. Just over half of the western portion of the highway has been designated the Beaver Canyon Scenic Byway as part of the Utah Scenic Byways and National Forest Scenic Byways programs.

Route description
SR-153 starts in Beaver, Utah as a surface street named 200 North at its intersection with SR-160 (Main Street). Continuing up the canyon, the route passes Three Creeks Reservoir, Eagle Point Ski Resort, and Puffer's Lake as it climbs into the Tushar Mountains.

After this peak, the route turns south for a few miles before resuming its general eastward direction. As it descends from the mountains, it follows City Creek down the canyon. Once out of the canyon, the route turns southeast towards the town of Junction, Utah in Piute County. As it enters the town, it turns due east to merge with Center Street until its eastern terminus at US-89 (Main Street).

History

The road from Beaver east to Puffer's Lake was first added to the state highway system in 1927 as part of SR-21. In 1941, SR-21 was extended east from Beaver to SR-11 (US-89) at Junction. In 1945, the road from Beaver to Junction was split off from SR-21 and designated as SR-153, reusing the newly vacated route number (former SR-153 was absorbed by SR-68 that same year).

The highway's route has remained mostly unchanged since 1945, except for some minor realignments.

SR-153 was designated the Beaver Canyon Scenic Byway, a Utah Scenic Byway on April 6, 1990, and subsequently designated a National Forest Service Byway on February 6, 1991.

Major intersections

See also

 List of state highways in Utah
 List of highways numbered 153

References

External links

153
 153
 153
153